The 1980–81 Greek Football Cup was the 39th edition of the Greek Football Cup.

Tournament details

Totally 58 teams participated, 18 from Alpha Ethniki and 40 from Beta Ethniki. It was held in six rounds, included the final. Concerning the two previous years, two-legged tie would be extended in third round too.

Even if many Alpha Ethniki teams eliminated from the first round, afterwards there were very interesting matches. AEK Athens had the most difficult draws, after they eliminated Panathinaikos and Aris, in order to be eliminated by PAOK with two losses in the semi-finals (second leg became in Chalcis due to punishment).

Olympiacos had to win Panionios during the extra time of second leg in Third Round in order to qualify, while the surprise of season were Panegialios, which qualify to semi-finals, after qualifies against OFI and Doxa Drama, both teams of Alpha Ethniki. They achieved good results in away second legs.

The final was contested by Olympiacos and PAOK, after 7 years and in the same stadium (AEK Stadium). Olympiacos won 3–1, clinching The Double after winning also the championship. The match was marked by riots between fans of both teams, one of the first expressions of hooliganism that was imported in Greece in the beginning of 1980 decade.

It is still characteristic that the footballers of both teams played wearing black brassards, Olympiacos players mourning the victims of tragedy of gate 7, and PAOK players in memory of their coach Gyula Lóránt, who had died at the bench on May 31, 1981.

Calendar

Knockout phase
Each tie in the knockout phase, apart from the first two rounds and the final, was played over two legs, with each team playing one leg at home. The team that scored more goals on aggregate over the two legs advanced to the next round. If the aggregate score was level, the away goals rule was applied, i.e. the team that scored more goals away from home over the two legs advanced. If away goals were also equal, then extra time was played. The away goals rule was again applied after extra time, i.e. if there were goals scored during extra time and the aggregate score was still level, the visiting team advanced by virtue of more away goals scored. If no goals were scored during extra time, the winners were decided by a penalty shoot-out. In the first two rounds and the final, which were played as a single match, if the score was level at the end of normal time, extra time was played, followed by a penalty shoot-out if the score was still level.The mechanism of the draws for each round is as follows:
There are no seedings, and teams from the same group can be drawn against each other.

First round

|}

Bracket

Second round

|}

Round of 16

|}

Quarter-finals

|}

Semi-finals

|}

Final

The 37th Greek Cup Final was played at the AEK Stadium.

References

External links
Greek Cup 1980-81 at RSSSF

Greek Football Cup seasons
Greek Cup
Cup